Scleromitrion is a genus of flowering plants in the family Rubiaceae, native to tropical and subtropical Asia and the western Pacific. The genus was first established in 1834 as a section of the genus Hedyotis, H. sect. Scleromitrion, and was raised to a full genus in 1838.

Species
, Plants of the World Online accepted the following species:
Scleromitrion angustifolium (Cham. & Schltdl.) Benth.
Scleromitrion brachypodum (DC.) T.C.Hsu
Scleromitrion capitatum Miq.
Scleromitrion delicatum (Halford) K.L.Gibbons
Scleromitrion diffusum (Willd.) R.J.Wang
Scleromitrion galioides (F.Muell.) K.L.Gibbons
Scleromitrion gibsonii (Halford) K.L.Gibbons
Scleromitrion gracilipes (Craib) Neupane & N.Wikstr.
Scleromitrion intonsum (Halford) K.L.Gibbons
Scleromitrion kerrii (Craib) Wangwasit & Chantar.
Scleromitrion koanum (R.J.Wang) R.J.Wang
Scleromitrion laceyi (Halford) K.L.Gibbons
Scleromitrion largiflorens (Halford) K.L.Gibbons
Scleromitrion leptocaule (Halford) K.L.Gibbons
Scleromitrion linoides (Griff.) Neupane & N.Wikstr.
Scleromitrion pauciflorum (Bartl. ex DC.) Miq.
Scleromitrion pinifolium (Wall. ex G.Don) R.J.Wang
Scleromitrion polycladum (F.Muell.) K.L.Gibbons
Scleromitrion scleranthoides (F.Muell.) K.L.Gibbons
Scleromitrion sirayanum T.C.Hsu & Z.H.Chen
Scleromitrion subulatum (Korth.) K.L.Gibbons
Scleromitrion tenelliflorum (Blume) Korth.
Scleromitrion tenuifolium (Burm.f.) K.L.Gibbons
Scleromitrion thysanotum (Halford) K.L.Gibbons
Scleromitrion verticillatum (L.) R.J.Wang

References

Spermacoceae
Rubiaceae genera